George Drew may refer to:
George Franklin Drew (1827–1900), governor of Florida
George Alexander Drew (Liberal-Conservative MP) (1826–1891), Canadian political figure
George A. Drew (1894–1973), Premier of Ontario (1942–1948), leader of the Progressive Conservative Partry of Canada (1948–1956)
George Smith Drew (1819–1880), Hulsean lecturer
George C. Drew, British experimental psychologist